Vasily Vasilievich Ignatius (21 June 1854 – 27 May 1905) was a Russian 1st Captain and painter of the Russo-Japanese War. He commanded the  throughout the war until he got killed at the Battle of Tsushima after the ship was sunk at the battle. He was also known for his several paintings of different Russian ships throughout the history of the Imperial Russian Navy.

Early military career
Ignatius was born on June 21, 1854, as the son of a 2nd Lieutenant of the 17th Artillery Brigade. He entered the Naval Cadet Corps on September 16, 1871, as a cadet. He entered into active service on April 13, 1872, before being made a Gardes de la Marine on April 13, 1875, and promoted to Michman on August 30, 1876. He then participated in several mine officer classes as a compulsory student on September 24, 1878, and made a mine officer of the  a day later.

Painting career
From August 26, 1888, to August 5, 1889, Ignatius left for Paris to study painting with Professor A. P. Bogolyubov. One month later, he gained permission from Grand Duke Alexei Alexandrovich to study at the Imperial Academy of Arts to practice painting with exemption from company teachings and classes. Ignatius proceeded to create portraits of several Russian ships throughout history.

Later career and the Russo-Japanese War
On April 19, 1890, he was made commander of the  but he was arrested for 2 weeks for landing neglect of the destroyer on December 3, 1890. On November 21, 1899, Ignatius was sent back to the Baltic Fleet to command destroyers and their crews at Kronstadt. He was promoted to Captain 1st Rank on April 1, 1901, and later given command of the Knyaz Suvorov on October 22. During the Russo-Japanese War, he commanded the Knyaz Suvorov but was killed at the Battle of Tsushima from a middle shell.

Awards
Order of Saint Stanislaus, III Class (July 5, 1883)
Order of Saint Stanislaus, II Class (1897)
Order of St. Vladimir, IV Class with a bow (1898)
Order of Saint Anna, II Class (1899)
Order of St. Vladimir, III Class (1904)

Foreign awards
 Spain: Cross of Naval Merit (December 15, 1888)

References

1854 births
1905 deaths
People from Saint Petersburg Governorate
Imperial Russian Navy officers
19th-century painters from the Russian Empire
Russian military personnel of the Russo-Japanese War
Recipients of the Order of St. Vladimir, 3rd class
Recipients of the Order of St. Vladimir, 4th class
Recipients of the Order of St. Anna, 2nd class
Recipients of the Order of Saint Stanislaus (Russian), 2nd class
Recipients of the Order of Saint Stanislaus (Russian), 3rd class
Russian military personnel killed in the Russo-Japanese War
Naval Cadet Corps alumni